The Tenom District is an administrative district in the Malaysian state of Sabah, part of the Interior Division which includes the districts of Beaufort, Keningau, Kuala Penyu, Nabawan, Sipitang, Tambunan and Tenom. The capital of the district is in Tenom Town.Majority Tenom is Murut while Kadazandusun as well as Lundayeh are minorities in Tenom.

Etymology 
The area was first called "Fort Birch" which named after North Borneo Governor Ernest Woodford Birch. Following the completion of the North Borneo Railway Line from Beaufort railway station to Tenom and Melalap railway stations, the place was subsequently renamed as "Tenom" in 1904.

History 
The district was established in the 1900s by the North Borneo Chartered Company with first district officer named M.C.M. Weedon. The opening of Tenom by the British began with the opening of Sapong Estate and Melalap Estate.

Demographics 

The population is made up of ethnic groups Murut (52%), Kadazan-Dusun (12%), Chinese (8%), Lun Bawang/Lundayeh (5%) and Malay (4%) together with a small proportion of other ethnic groups such as Indonesians and Filipinos. The majority of nearly 5,000 Chinese, descendants of immigrants from Longchuan in Guangdong, come from the ethnic group of Hakka. The population of the district according to the 2010 census is 55,553 inhabitants.

The population is made up of ethnicities as follows:

Gallery

See also 
 Districts of Malaysia

References

Further reading

External links 

  Tenom District Council
 Tenom District Office